The 2017 Dutch TT was the eighth round of the 2017 MotoGP season. It was held at the TT Circuit Assen in Assen on 25 June 2017. The MotoGP race was won by Valentino Rossi, the final victory of his career.

Classification

MotoGP

Moto2

 Lorenzo Baldassari suffered a concussion in a crash during qualifying and withdrew from the event.
 Xavi Vierge suffered a broken arm in a crash during free practice and withdrew from the event.

Moto3

Championship standings after the race

MotoGP
Below are the standings for the top five riders and constructors after round eight has concluded.

Riders' Championship standings

Constructors' Championship standings

 Note: Only the top five positions are included for both sets of standings.

Moto2

Moto3

Notes

References

Dutch
TT
Dutch TT
Dutch